Herri Torrontegui, born  in Gorliz, is a former Grand Prix motorcycle road racer from Spain. His best year was 1989, when he won two Grand Prix races and finished in fourth place in the 80cc world championship.

After his racing career, he served as a manager for Spanish rider, Efrén Vázquez competing for the Ajo Motorsport team.

References 

People from Mungialdea
Sportspeople from Biscay
Spanish motorcycle racers
125cc World Championship riders
250cc World Championship riders
1967 births
Living people
80cc World Championship riders